Toast to our Differences is the third studio album by English drum and bass band Rudimental, released on 25 January 2019 through Asylum Records. The album was originally planned to be released in September 2018, but was delayed to include more tracks.

It is supported by the singles "Sun Comes Up" featuring James Arthur, "These Days" featuring Macklemore, Jess Glynne and Dan Caplen, which reached number one on the UK Singles Chart, "Let Me Live" with Major Lazer and featuring Anne-Marie and Mr Eazi, and "Walk Alone" featuring Tom Walker. The band also played several shows in the lead-up to the album's release.

Background and recording
The album was called "the rich fruit of the collective's past three years of work" as well as "an emphatic celebration of difference and a coming together of cultures and genres". Speaking about the features on the album, Kesi Dryden said the band are "always looking for up-and-coming talent. We've got this great opportunity to give people a platform", and called the vocalists featured "amazing". MTV called the track listing "hefty" and named it an album to look out for in 2019.

Track listing

Charts

Certifications

Notes

References

2019 albums
Asylum Records albums
Rudimental albums
Major Tom's albums